A guru is a spiritual teacher.

Guru or The Guru may also refer to:

Computing 
 Guru.com, a software company and job board service
 Guru, a language with dependent types
 .guru, an Internet top-level domain

Film 
 The Guru (1969 film), a Merchant–Ivory film
 Guru (1980 film), a Tamil film starring Kamal Haasan and Sridevi
 Guru (1989 film), a Hindi-language film directed by Umesh Mehra
 Guru (1997 film), a Malayalam film directed by Rajiv Anchal
 The Guru (2002 film), a British film directed by Daisy von Scherler Mayer
 Guru (2003 film), a Bengali film directed by Swapan Saha
 Guru (2005 film), a Telugu film directed by B Jaffer
 Guru (2006 film), a film about the yoga guru K. Pattabhi Jois directed by Robert Wilkins
 Guru (2007 film), a Hindi film directed by Mani Ratnam
 Guru (2012 film), a Kannada film directed by Jaggesh
 Guru (2016 film), a Marathi film directed by Sanjay Jadhav
 Guru (2017 film), a Telugu film directed by Sudha Kongara

Places
 Guru, Iran, a village in Kerman Province, Iran
 Guru, Kerman, a village in Kerman Province, Iran
 Guru, Jiroft, a village in Kerman Province, Iran
 Guru, Hormozgan, a village in Hormozgan Province, Iran

Language and literature 
 Guru (prosody), a "heavy" syllable in Sanskrit prosody
 Gurmukhi alphabet (ISO 15924 code Guru), one of three scripts for writing the Punjabi language
 GuRu, a 2018 book by RuPaul

Music 
 Guru (rapper) (1961–2010), hip hop MC from Gang Starr
 Guru (Ghanaian rapper) (born 1987)
 The Guru (album), a 2005 album by PSD
 Guru (soundtrack), a soundtrack album from the 2007 film

Other media 
 "The Guru" (Avatar: The Last Airbender), an episode of Avatar: The Last Airbender
 The Guru (Sly Cooper), a character from the video game Sly 3: Honor Among Thieves

People
 Gurutze Fernández (born 1979), or Guru, Spanish footballer
 Eric Grothe Sr. (born 1960), Australian former rugby league footballer nicknamed "Guru"

Other uses 
 Guru, Hindu astrological name for the planet Jupiter
 Guru Studio, a Canadian animation studio
 Global Urban Research Unit, at Newcastle University

See also 
 GuRoo, a humanoid robot
 Expert, a person with extensive knowledge or ability in a particular domain 
 Gru (disambiguation)